Lenomyrmex inusitatus is a Neotropical species of ant in the subfamily Myrmicinae. The worker of Lenomyrmex inusitatus is distinguished from other Lenomyrmex workers by smooth and shiny mesosoma with well-developed propodeal spines and by the foveolate-striate sculpture covering all the dorsal surface of its head. L. inusitatus has an unusual distribution since it is the single Lenomyrmex species recorded east of the Andes.

References

Myrmicinae
Insects described in 2001
Hymenoptera of South America